Trebanos is a village in the Swansea Valley, Wales. With Craig Trebanos and a part of Pontardawe, it forms the Trebanos electoral ward in the Neath Port Talbot county borough.

Controversy and opposition concerning the South Wales Gas Pipeline passing through the village led to media attention for the village and a protest camp in 2006 and 2007.

Name 
The village's name in standard Welsh is 'Trebannws'. But in the Welsh-language dialect of the area, there is a tendency to pronounce the final vowel as an 'o'. This has given rise to the form 'Trebanos', which is the form usually used in English.

Education 
Primary Schools

Trebanos Welsh Primary School

Sport and leisure 
Trebanos is home to local rugby union club Trebanos RFC, a team founded in 1887 which is a member of the Welsh Rugby Union.

Notable residents 
Notable people from Trebanos include rugby union players Bleddyn Bowen, who captained Wales to the 1988 Triple Crown, Robert Jones, who was capped for Wales 54 times and helped win the 1988 Triple Crown, fly-half Arwel Thomas who was capped for Wales 23 times and openside flanker Justin Tipuric.

Greg Thomas, a first-class cricketer and fast bowler was born in Trebanos.

Actress Harriet Lewis who played Maggie Post in the Welsh soap opera Pobl Y Cwm was born and lived in Trebanos all her life.

References

External links
 NPT - Trebanos Councillor
 www.geograph.co.uk : photos of Trebanos and surrounding area

Villages in Neath Port Talbot
Swansea Valley